Bradley Todd Player (born 18 January 1967, in Benoni) is a former South African first class cricketer for Free State and Western Province. An all-rounder, his career lasted from 1984/85 until 2000/01. He bowled both right-arm fast-medium and offbreaks and as a right-handed batsman he made 4 first class hundreds. Player was also a regular for South Africa in the Hong Kong Sixes.

In February 2020, he was named in South Africa's squad for the Over-50s Cricket World Cup in South Africa. However, the tournament was cancelled during the third round of matches due to the coronavirus pandemic.

References

External links

1967 births
Living people
South African cricketers
Boland cricketers
Western Province cricketers
Free State cricketers